Jan Pêt Khorto (born 1986) is a Syrian Kurdish poet, writer, and public speaker. His poetry is categorised as having political orientation and has been characterized as exile literature.

Biography
Born in Aleppo. Jan is of a Kurdish descent. From Afrin; a Kurdish city in north-western Syria. He studied his formal education in Aleppo, and then moved to Damascus to study Journalism at Damascus University in 2006. While at university, Jan initiated an underground newspaper together with few Kurdish and Arab journalists and artists. Their activities were spotted by the Syrian intelligence services, and a couple of the members were arrested. In 2007, Jan Pêt has been arrested as well due to his literary and political activism in Aleppo. He was released after several months in various Mukhabarat centres, including Political, Military, General and Air Force Intelligence Directorates. He currently lives in Copenhagen, Denmark as an exiled writer.
He started a newspaper in 2010 (ID-Zone) that focused on the asylum seekers living conditions and stories in Denmark. The newspaper lasted 11 months. He was a co-founder of the Syrian Cultural Institute in Denmark in 2015, and occupied the position of the Vice-President at the board for a period of a year from 2016 to 2017

Works

Jan Pêt began writing poetry at a very young age. His first poetry collection (Never Ending Words - in Arabic) was published at the age of 17. The collection was not approved by the Syrian Ministry of Culture, and therefore was banned in the country. Same happened with his second collection (The Puzzles - in Arabic) at the age of 19.

Two poetry collections were translated and published in Denmark; (Helveds Fristelser, 2011) and (Edens Vugge - Hviskende Skæbner fra Syrien, 2016). His last poetry collection was published by the Egyptian Ministry of Culture in 2017 in Arabic.

Published works

Poem collections
First Collection of Poems, Never Ending Words, 2005 Aleppo, in Arabic.
Second Collection of Poems, The Puzzles, 2007 Aleppo, in Arabic
Third Collection of Poems, Helveds Fistelser, 2011 Copenhagen, in Danish
Fourth Collection of Poems, Edens Vugge - Hviskende Skæbner fra Syrien, 2016 Copenhagen, in Danish.
Fifth Collection of Poems, Hell's Temptations - When Homelands are Carried in Bags, 2017 Cairo, in Arabic.

Education

BA. Journalism and Mass Media, Damascus University 2006 - 2008 (expelled due to literary and political activities)
BSc. International Business and Politics, Copenhagen Business School 2013 - 2016
MSc. Political Science, Aarhus University 2016 - 2018

Influences

Kahlil Gibran, Jorge Luis Borges, Kafka

References

Kurdish poets
1986 births
Living people